Eulàlia Lledó i Cunill (born 1952) is a doctor in Romance Philology from the University of Barcelona, a specialist in sexism and language research. She has received several awards for her work, including the Creu de Sant Jordi in 2008. She is currently a contributor to HuffPost.

Biography
Eulàlia Lledó has been a secondary school teacher in Barcelona for years, and collaborates with several universities and gender studies networks, including the Genet Network of the Spanish National Research Council (CSIC). She is a specialist in investigating sexist and androcentric biases in literature and language.

She has prepared numerous guides and manuals on the subject, including Cómo tratar bien a los malos tratos. Manual de Estilo para los Medios de Comunicación (How to Treat Mistreatment Properly: Style Manual for the Media) in 1999, which was the first print guide in Spain with recommendations for the treatment of media and gender violence. She has also written numerous books on coeducation, articles, and literary reviews, especially on women's writings.

She has been part of the Nombra group, Advisory Commission of the Women's Institute of the Government of Spain, since its foundation in 1994.

She has collaborated on the revision of the Diccionari General de la Llengua Catalana by the Institut d'Estudis Catalans and on the revision of the Diccionario de la lengua española by the Royal Spanish Academy.

In March 2018 she participated in the encounter "La fórmula de la igualdad" (The Formula of Equality) at the RTVE Corporation with an intervention on the insensitive biases of sexism.

She is currently a contributor to the Spanish edition of HuffPost.

Awards and honours
 In 2008, Lledó was awarded the Creu de Sant Jordi for her "interest in avoiding sexist and androcentric uses of language."

Works

Books about language

References

External links
  

1952 births
20th-century Spanish educators
Spanish women educators
20th-century Spanish women writers
21st-century Spanish educators
21st-century Spanish women writers
Philologists from Catalonia
Women writers from Catalonia
Gender studies academics
Living people
Spanish feminists
Spanish lexicographers
Spanish women academics
University of Barcelona alumni
Women lexicographers
Writers from Barcelona
Women philologists
20th-century women educators
21st-century women educators